Maria Evgenievna Filatova (born July 19, 1961) is a retired Soviet gymnast who competed at the 1976 and 1980 Olympics.

Career
Filatova began competing for the USSR junior team in 1974. In 1976 she placed fourth at the USSR National Championships and competed well in various international events.

Filatova was originally named as an alternate to the Soviet team at the 1976 Summer Olympics in Montreal. However, during podium training, she received such a positive reaction from the crowd that she was added to the team roster. She shared in the team gold medal and was ranked ninth overall after the team competition. Because four of her teammates scored higher than she did and only three gymnasts per team were allowed to compete in the all-around, she did not advance to the AA finals in spite of her high placement.

Following the Olympics and the retirements of several high-profile gymnasts, including Ludmilla Tourischeva and Olga Korbut, Filatova emerged as one of the leaders of the Soviet team. She won the World Cup in 1977 and 1978; the USSR Nationals in 1977, and the Riga International meet in 1977 and 1979. At the 1980 Olympics, Filatova served as the lead-off gymnast on several events and contributed to the team's gold medal. She continued to the 1981 World Championships, where she was the silver medalist in the all-around.

British journalist David Hunn referred to Filatova as a "fifteen-year-old in the Korbut tradition." As Korbut, Filatova was known for her enthusiastic, expressive floor exercise routines and her difficult acrobatic skills. She was one of the first female gymnasts to successfully compete a double back somersault on floor in 1975.

Following her retirement in 1982, Filatova worked for several years with the British Gymnastics Federation (in Belfast) before moving to the United States. She now lives and coaches in Rochester, New York.

Achievements (non-Olympic)

External links and sources

List of competitive results at Gymn-Forum.net

Hunn, David; (1980). The Complete Book of Gymnastics, London : Ward Lock Ltd. .

1961 births
Living people
People from Leninsk-Kuznetsky
Soviet female artistic gymnasts
Gymnasts at the 1976 Summer Olympics
Gymnasts at the 1980 Summer Olympics
Olympic gold medalists for the Soviet Union
Olympic bronze medalists for the Soviet Union
Olympic gymnasts of the Soviet Union
Olympic medalists in gymnastics
Medalists at the World Artistic Gymnastics Championships
Medalists at the 1980 Summer Olympics
Medalists at the 1976 Summer Olympics
European champions in gymnastics